John Gray was an early English steam locomotive engineer who introduced several innovations in locomotive design during the 1830s and 1840s. John Gray's origins were thought to be unknown but he appears to have originated from Newcastle. John Gray was born 29 August 1810 in Newcastle upon Tyne, Northumberland, England.

Career

Innovations
In 1838 he was working for the Liverpool and Manchester Railway where he was the first engineer to use the balanced slide valve on locomotives, and later applied a form of expansion gear. In 1840 he was appointed locomotive superintendent of the Hull and Selby Railway where he became the first locomotive engineer to use long-travel valve motion.

Locomotive superintendent
In 1845 he was appointed locomotive superintendent of the Croydon Dover and Brighton Joint Committee, which then operated the pooled locomotive fleets of the London and Croydon Railway, the South Eastern Railway and the London and Brighton Railway. On the dissolution of this committee and the formation of the London Brighton and South Coast Railway in 1846 Gray was appointed Locomotive Superintendent at Brighton works. However in 1847 he was dismissed from this post as a result of problems over the late delivery of locomotives from Timothy Hackworth.

References

English engineers
English railway mechanical engineers
Locomotive builders and designers
Locomotive superintendents
London, Brighton and South Coast Railway people
Year of birth missing
Year of death missing